Veniamin is the Russian version of the name Benjamin, and may refer to:

Veniamin Alexandrov (1937–1991), Soviet professional ice hockey player
Veniamin Belkin (1884–1951), Russian artist and painter
Veniamin Fleishman, (1913–1941), Russian composer
Veniamin Kagan (1869–1953), Russian mathematician and expert in geometry
Veniamin Kaverin (1902–1989), Soviet writer associated with the early 1920s movement of the Serapion Brothers
Veniamin (Kazansky) (1873–1922), bishop in the Russian Orthodox Church, Archbishop of Petrograd 1917–1922
Veniamin Kondratyev (born 1970), Russian politician and governor of Krasnodar Krai
Veniamin Levich (1917–1987), physicist, an expert in the field of electrochemical hydrodynamics
Veniamin Mandrykin (born 1981), Russian professional football goalkeeper
Veniamin of Petersburg (1874–1922), Metropolitan of Petrograd and Gdov 1917–1922
Veniamin Smekhov (born 1940), Russian actor and stage director
Veniamin Soldatenko (born 1939), former Soviet athlete who competed mainly in the 50 km walk
Veniamin Tayanovich (born 1967), retired Russian freestyle swimmer

As a last name:
Andrew Veniamin (1975–2004), Australian criminal, a suspected mass murderer and drug dealer

Russian masculine given names